Novogradsky is a rural locality (a settlement) and the administrative center of Voznesenskoye Rural Settlement, Talovsky District, Voronezh Oblast, Russia. The population was 103 as of 2010.

Geography 
Novogradsky is located 32 km east of Talovaya (the district's administrative centre) by road. Abramovka is the nearest rural locality.

References 

Rural localities in Talovsky District